Sir Gaṅgānāth Jhā (25 December 1872 – 9 November 1941) was a scholar of Sanskrit, Indian philosophy and Buddhist philosophy.

Service
At the age of 24, he was appointed a librarian of the Darbhanga state by its Maharaja. In 1902, he was appointed a Professor of Sanskrit at Muir College in Allahabad, which he left in 1918 to become the first Indian principal of the Government Sanskrit College in Benares. Between 1920 and 1923 he served as a member of the Council of State in the Central British Government of India.

He was vice-chancellor of University of Allahabad (Prayag University) during 1923–32. The University of Allahabad established the Ganganath Jha Hostel in his honour.

Honors and awards

 Honorary Fellow of the Asiatic Society, 1924
 Campbell Memorial Gold Medal, Bombay Branch of the Royal Asiatic Society, 1935
 Knight Bachelor, 1941 Birthday Honours List

Literary work
Sir GN Jha written numerous books and translated many Sanskrit books into English.

Books authored
 The Prabhakar school of Purva-Mimansa, Allahabad University, 1911.
 Kavi Rahasya, Hindustan Academy Press, Prayag.
 Nyaya Prakash, Nagari Pracharini Sabha, Benares, 1920.
 Vaisveshik Darsha, Nagari Pracharini Sabha, Benares, 1921.
 The Philosophical Discipline, Calcutta University, 1928.
 Sources of Hindu law, Indian Press, Allahabad, 1930.
 Hindu Vidhi Ka Srota, Patna University, 1931.
 Shankar Vedant, Allahabad University, 1939.
 Purva-Mimansa in its sources, Banaras Hindu University, 1942.
 Yoga Darshana, Theosophical Society, Madras.

Books translated
 Chandogyopanishad, G.A. Nelson & Co., Madras, 1899.
 Yoga-Darsana, Theosophical Publication, Bombay, 1907.
 Gautam ka Nyaya Sutra, Oriental Book Agency, Poona, 1913.
 The Purva-Mimansa Sastra of Gemini, Pāṇini office, Allahabad, 1916.
 Sloka Vartika, Asiatic Society of Bengal, Calcutta, 1924.
 Tantra-Bhasa, Oriental Book Agency, Poona, 1925.
 Manusmriti, in five Volumes, Calcutta University, 1920–1926.
 Yoga Sar Sangrah, Oriental Book Agency, Poona, 1931.
 Tattvasamgraha of Shantarakshita, (in two Volumes), Baroda Oriental Institute, Baroda, 1936.
 Shabarbhasya, (in three Voumes), Baroda Oriental Institute, Baroda, 1939.

Books edited
 Memansa Nyaya Prakash, 1904.
 Gautam Ka Nyayasutra, Oriental Book Agency, Poona, 1931.
 Nyayadarshana, Coukhamba Sanskrit Series, Benares, 1925.
 Jyant Bhatt ki Nyayakalika, Sanskrit Bhavan Texts, Benares, 1925.
 Mimansa Paribhasha, Medical Hall Press, Benares, 1905.
 Bhavana Vivek, Govt. Press, Allahabad, 1922.
 Mimansa Mandan, Coukhamba Sanskrit Series, Benares, 1929.
 Manusmriti, Asiatic Society, Bengal.
 Tantra Ratna, Sanskrit Bhavan Texts, Benares, 1930.
 Vad vinod, Indian Press, Allahabad, 1915.
 Khandan Khanda Khadya, Coukhamba Sanskrit Series, Benares, 1914.
 Purush Pariksha, Veledeiyer, Allahabad, 1911.
 Kadambari, Sanskrit Bhavan Texts, Benares.
 Prasanna Raghav Natan, Sanskrit Bhavan Texts, Benares.
 Meghdootam, Sanskrit Bhavan Texts, Benares.

Ganganath Jha Research Institute
Rashtriya Sanskrit Sansthan (Ganganatha Jha Campus), formerly known as Ganganath Jha Research Institute (from 1943 to 1971) and Ganganatha Jha Kendriya Sanskrit Vidyapeeth (from 1971 to 2002 under the Ministry of HRD, Government of India) was founded on 17 November 1943 with a view to perpetuate the name and works of M. M. Dr. Sir Ganganatha Jha (b. 1871 & d.1941), an International figure of Orientology and Indology. This is the research training centre of Rashtriya Sanskrit Sansthan from 2016 to 2017.

References

External links 
 Manusmṛti with the Manubhāṣya of Medhātithi translation and additional notes by Ganganath Jha.

Writers from Gujarat
People from Bihar
19th-century Indian translators
People from Madhubani district
Indian scholars of Buddhism
Academic staff of the University of Allahabad
19th-century Indian philosophers
Indian logicians
Nyaya
Knights Bachelor
Indian Knights Bachelor
1872 births
1941 deaths
English-language writers from India
20th-century Indian philosophers
20th-century Indian translators
Corresponding Fellows of the British Academy
Members of the Council of State (India)